A stagnogley soil is a typically non-alluvial, non-calcareous, loamy or clayey soil with a relatively impervious, subsurface horizon.
Stagnogley soils are related to the pseudogleys and are a type of gleyic soil. The name of this hygroscopic soil derives from its gley dynamics. The nutrient-poor, often heavily acidified soil is poorly aerated and is not suited to arable use on account of the poor growth performance of cultivated crops. As a shallow topsoil with a moderately stony subsoil, it is mainly used for woodland. Because of its shallow nature it is only suitable for species of trees that thrive well in these conditions, such as the English Oak.

Formation 
This type of soil, the topsoil of which becomes bleached as a result of continual waterlogging, is often formed on sand-rich material over dense, sandy-loamy to silty-clayey subsoil - also called Sandkerf in German - in cool, moist climatic zones. As a result of frequent waterlogging throughout the seasons at low temperatures, minerals like iron and magnesium are released and deposited in sandy topsoils to the sides. Where the soil is saturated all-year round it turns into bog stagnogley and, eventually, into bog. Examples, known as missen occur in the Black Forest in Germany.

Extent 
Stagnogley soils occur in perhumid climates and also on steep slopes. They are found, for example, in the central European Central Upland ranges of the Black Forest, Ore Mountains and Eifel in waterlogged places, as well as on the Midvale Ridge in the UK. Due to the discharge of heavy metals, they occur with oxigleys.

References 

Types of soil
Pedology